Guo Yufang (born 15 March 1999) is a Chinese racing cyclist. She rode in the women's sprint event at the 2018 UCI Track Cycling World Championships.

References

1999 births
Living people
Chinese female cyclists
Place of birth missing (living people)
21st-century Chinese women